Snønipa is a mountain in Vestland county, Norway. It forms a nunatak of the Myklebustbreen glacier.

References

Mountains of Vestland
Sunnfjord
Gloppen